is a 1964 Japanese black-and-white crime film directed by Kinji Fukasaku.

Plot
Three brothers are born in a slum. Kuroki, the eldest brother, leaves to join a yakuza organization. Jirō, the middle brother, leaves five years later, leaving the youngest brother Sabu to care for their mother alone. Kuroki's organization sets up Jirō to be arrested and he spends five years in jail. When he is released, he finds Sabu and others carrying his mother's coffin away and Sabu tells him that their mother would not have wanted to see him anyway because he stole her money when he left.

At the opening of Club Phoenix, Kuroki's boss tells him that Jirō has been released and that he must keep him close in order to keep an eye on him. Sabu attempts to bring their mother's cremated remains to Kuroki but Kuroki gives him money for a grave and kicks him out. Sabu throws the remains in the river and uses the money to celebrate his freedom with his friends. At the Mizuhara Trading office, Jirō and Mizuhara plot to rob 20 million yen from the Iwasaki Group as it is being transported. Kuroki arrives and gives Jirō money to leave town but Jirō buys forged passports and cheaply recruits Sabu and Sabu's friends to help with the robbery.

At the airport, Sabu's friends stage a brawl as a distraction while Jirō and Mizuhara stick up the three bagmen at gunpoint and put sunglasses covered in black tape over their eyes to blind them as Sabu and Mako grab the bags of money and flee. Jirō attempts to rob the money from Sabu at Sabu's hideout but only finds Mako, who says that Sabu has left with the bags. Mizuhara also arrives and fruitlessly attempts to rob the money from Jirō. Sabu's friends arrive and one of them, Akira, is killed in a struggle with Mizuhara. Jirō's lover Kyōko enters and tells them that the locals are gathering outside. Jirō convinces the locals that he is Kuroki from the Iwasaki Group investigating people who have betrayed the Group and tells them not to interfere. Sabu arrives and tells his friends that they have been betrayed because the bags contained 20 million yen in cash and 20 million yen in drugs, despite the meager cut promised to them.

After being overpowered, Sabu refuses to give up the location of the bags despite being beaten so Jirō and Mizuhara torture his friends one by one to make him talk. Iwasaki sends Kuroki to investigate and Kuroki goes to the slum but leaves after only finding black tape in Sabu's house. Sabu's friend Hiroshi lies to Jirō that the bags were left at the club. Jirō takes Sabu's gun to the club, where he is attacked by Iwasaki members who had been following Kuroki. They learn from the club owner that Jirō was looking for Sabu's bags, which leads them to link the robbery to Kuroki when they find the black tape on him. Sabu and his friends escape and run in different directions but Hiroshi is caught by the Iwasaki Group and the others return to Jirō and Mizuhara.

Kuroki, arriving to be questioned, sees a beaten Hiroshi being put into the trunk of a car. He is told that he is responsible for his brothers and must get the drugs and money back. Jirō and Mizuhara continue torturing Sabu but Sabu refuses to talk and breaks his own hands with bricks to prove his determination. Kuroki arrives and attempts to take Sabu away but they all know that Sabu will be tortured by the Iwasaki Group so Sabu refuses to leave. Kuroki threatens to torture Mizuhara to make them talk but Mizuhara begs for ten minutes to talk things over with the other participants in the robbery. Mizuhara threatens to shoot one of Sabu's friends but is shot by Jirō.

Kuroki holds the members of the Iwasaki Organization at bay outside and begs Sabu to surrender. Takeshi surrenders but is shot in the back by Sabu, who joins forces with Jirō and tells Kuroki that he must join them and fight against the Iwasaki Group if he wants to know where the bags are. As Kuroki stands to make his decision, the other members of the Iwasaki Group storm the hideout and kill everyone inside. As Kuroki walks away the slum-dwellers pelt him with objects, including a dead rat.

Cast

Rentarō Mikuni as Kuroki, the eldest brother
Ken Takakura as Jirō, the middle brother
Kin'ya Kitaōji as Sabu, the youngest brother
Shinjirō Ehara as Mizuhara
Renji Ishibashi as Hiroshi
Hideo Murota as Mizuhara
Sanae Nakahara
Jirō Okazaki as Takeji
Hiroko Shima as Mako
Shunji Kasuga as Nishimura
Shōken Sawa as Iwasaki
Seiichi Shisui as Akira
Seiji Echizenya as Isao
Masa Suganuma as Noda
Akira Katayama as Iwasaki's assistant
Tadashi Naitō
Shirō Ōki as Kurabu's Boy
Pierre Segawa as Manager
Sakae Shima as Iwasaki's assistant
Gōzō Sōma
Minoru Sawada as Iwasaki's henchman
Nobuo Yana as Bagman
Takashi Hio
Kōji Miemachi as Iwasaki's henchman
Masahito Mizuki as Iwasaki's assistant
Kiyome Takemura as Waitress
Hideko Konoe
Akemi Fuji as Waitress
Midori Yamamoto
Yuriko Anjō

Production
In an interview with Kinji Fukasaku in the book Outlaw Masters of Japanese Film, Fukasaku spoke about his attempt to make a film different from the usual Toei yakuza films, saying, "My desire is not only in defeating evil but how far desire can go. Even if desire doesn't get that far and fails, as long as you stick with an emotion then the main character could be understood."

Release
The film had a wide release in Japan on August 26, 1964. It has also been released under the titles Wolves, Pigs and People, and Wolf, Pig, and Man.

Reception
In a positive review in Critics Roundup, reviewer Marc Walkow wrote, "For the first few years of his career, Fukusaku and Toei were more or less content to mimic the stle and feel of rival Nikkatsu's popular 'borderless action' films... But Fukusaku's sixth film, Wolves, Pigs and Men (64), broke the mold by taking the best elements from his earlier films and adding a biting commentary on the social problems endemic to Japan's transition from postwar defeated nation to economic powerhouse."

In the book Historical Dictionary of Japanese Cinema, author Jasper Sharp writes that, along with Gang vs. G-Men, "Wolves, Pigs and Men, which pitted three slum-dwelling gangster brothers against one another, established Fukasaku's pattern for contemporary action and crime dramas inspired by the French New Wave and American noir, featuring realistic portrayals of violence and often set in chaotic, working-class milieux."

References

External links
 

1964 films
1960s Japanese films
1964 crime films
Japanese black-and-white films
Japanese crime films
Films directed by Kinji Fukasaku
1960s Japanese-language films
Toei Company films
Yakuza films
Films set in Yokohama
Films about brothers
Films about poverty
Films about robbery